Thomas Mathis may refer to:
 Thomas Mathis (sport shooter), Austrian sports shooter
 Thomas A. Mathis, American politician and racketeer